Patrick Muzingo (born September 27, 1965) is an American drummer. He started playing the drums at the age of 12. Hailing from Los Angeles, California he grew up with a supportive family that boasted other musicians. Growing up in the 1970s and 80s brought the drummer into some amazing situations. Looking back Muzingo experienced the 1st wave of Pool skating, was one of the original Eagle Rock ramp (featured in Thrasher, Transworld Skateboarding and others) crew, witnessed many genres of music in its infancy including the 1st wave of Punk rock and the late 1980s signing spree of rock bands in Los Angeles. 

Muzingo reflects back (from a 2005 interview) on growing up during these important times- "Its funny, I used to skate with so many now famous skaters. I even entered contests where I beat a few skaters that are now multi millionaires. With the music thing I saw friends go from living with various girlfriends to owning huge houses and selling multi platinum releases. I was in some pretty cool situations. I got to grow up with many now successful/ famous people. Unfortunately I saw many talented people fall to dependencies that lead to their own demise."

Skateboarding was a passion of his until 1983 when he had to make the decision to either go the distance skating or make the commitment to play drums full-time. He decided to go the route of a musician which proved to be the right one. From 1985 to late 1986 he decided to call San Francisco home and was playing with The Pirates of Venus which featured members of Decry, Verbal Abuse and Tales of Terror. The then "SF sound" was not "paying the bills" so he decided to split back to LA. Within 2 hours of his arrival back home he was called by Chris Gates from the Big Boys and Poison 13 (which he had met touring through Texas with Decry back in 1984) to join a then up and coming six-month-old Junkyard. Muzingo was already a fan of Gates so it was a no brainer.

From 1986 until the present he has recorded for Junkyard as well as MCA artists Suckerpunch, Sex Pistol Steve Jones and country rockers Speedbuggy USA. There were many other acts that he sat in with but none released anything worth mentioning.

Current 
Currently he is working as a web programmer in California, playing drums full-time with Junkyard. The most recent release (May, 2020) is Junkyards "Rome is Burning" (digital only). 

Muzingo continues skateboarding & running daily thanks to his wife and daughter.

Associated acts

The AtomsMembers included Guns N' Roses guitarist Jeff Isbell aka Izzy Stradlin, D.F.L. vocalist Monty Messex, Lip Service Clothing owner Drew Bernstein on guitar, Bassist Oscar Harvey and Guitarist Taz Rudd. The band opened up for many acts such as the original Misfits, Social Distortion, T.S.O.L., D.O.A., etc.

S.V.D.B.Members include guitarist Vic Makauskas of Painted Willie and vocalist Brandon Cruz, currently of the Dead Kennedys. The group put out 4 releases on Mystic Records from 1980–1983

The TouristsBYO Compilation "Something to Believe in". Song- "Memories" BYO Records 1983

Americas Hardcore/Section EightFounded by Lip Service Clothing owner Drew Bernstein on guitar. Various releases on Mystic records. All Mystic drum tracks were played by Muzingo. He was later replaced by good friend Aaron Glascock who was credited on most of the Mystic tracks.

DecryFrom 1983-1986 the band toured the US quite a few times and was featured on many radio shows such as Rodney on the Roq. Many bands opened for Decry such as Guns N' Roses, L.A. Guns, Raw Power, Corrosion of Conformity, and CH3  to name a few. In 1996 Cleopatra Records released a retrospective on the band. The band is currently reformed with original singer Farrell Holtz. In 1990 original Decry bassist Todd Muscat (Kill for Thrills) joined Muzingo again as the bassist for Junkyard.

ShanghaiOffshoot of Decry with original Symbol Six singer Eric Leach and guitarist Taz Rudd. Band worked extensively with Kim Fowley in 1987.

The Pirates of VenusFeatured vocalist "Rats Ass" from punk legends Tales of Terror and guitarist Joie Mastrokalos from Verbal Abuse, Circle of Soul and Duff McKagan's solo band.

Battery ClubFormed band with MTV V.J. Riki Rachtman

The Rhythm SlavesFormed with guitarist Brian Forsythe from KIX and Rhino Bucket and bassist of Faster Pussycat.

CatfishOffshoot of The Rhythm Slaves with Brian Forsythe from KIX and Adam White AKA Rail of Liars Inc.

High City Miles/SuckerpunchSuckerpunch was released in 1996 on 510/MCA records. The band did spot touring with Cheap Trick, Bad Religion and US Bombs. Imprint label (510 records) folded in 1997. Band featured former members of Broken Glass and The Cult and current guitarist of Junkyard. Suckerpunch has also featured on many TV shows. The band recently reunited after 20+ years, with all 4 original members returning. The entirety of their album was performed at the Viper Room, West Hollywood on February 2, 2019.

Smack/The Wyndham StallsBand was featured on Howard Stern radio show before splitting up in early 2004.

Speedbuggy USAToo many releases to quote here. Extensive world tours for 8+ years.

JunkyardThe band existed between the years 1986–1992. Many tours of the US and England headlining and opening up for the likes of Lynrd Skynyrd, The Almighty, The Black Crowes, The Supersuckers, Guns N' Roses, Soul Asylum, Danzig, Social Distortion, Janes Addiction and more.

Junkyard disbanded in late 1992 only to reform again in 1999 to do a 5 city tour of Japan. Since 1999 they have done sporadic shows including the Serie Z Spanish music festival in mid-2003 and have released a live CD and a 6-song EP of new material. 

From 2014 - present Junkyard continues to put out new music and tour the world.

Drums/endorsements
1991 – 1993, 2015–present - Endorses DW (Drum Workshop) Drums, Pedals and Hardware 

July 10, 2019 - Officially endorses Centent Cymbals
July 31, 2018 - Officially endorses Aquarian Drumheads
May 18, 2016 - Officially endorses Los Cabos Drumsticks. Stick preference: White Hickory Rock model (D=.626" L=16.63")

Current Setup 

DW (Drum Workshop) Collector's Series® White Glass

5.5x14 Collector's Series® Black Nickel over Brass
5.5x14 Collector's Series® Aluminum
5x15 Contemporary Classic® Transparent Light Purple Over Ultra White Marine Snare (Poplar/Mahogany)
5x16 Collector's Series® Clear Acrylic Snare
5x16 Maple Snare drum
14x26 bass
9x13 Rack Tom
16x18 Floor Tom

All DW Hardware and Pedals

1991 DW (Drum Workshop) Maple kit. White Marine Pearl FinishPly™

18x26 bass
11x14 Rack Tom
16x18 Floor Tom

Centent Cymbals

20" LAD Crash
22" LAD Custom Ride (3290g)

Aquarian Drumheads

Super-2 Clear w/ Power Dot (Snare & Floor Tom)
Super Kick II (Bass Drum)

References

External links 
http://www.speedbuggyusa.com
https://www.junkyardblooze.com
http://www.myspace.com/junkyard
http://www.sleazeroxx.com/bands/junkyard/junk.shtml

1965 births
American rock drummers
Living people
20th-century American drummers
American male drummers
20th-century American male musicians